Dorayd bin Al Summah or Duraid son of As-Simmah was a pre-Islamic warrior, knight and poet of the Hawazin tribe. He was also the chief of the Banu Jusham bin Sa'd, or the modern day Al-Qthami clan of the tribe of Otaibah. Historians have cited that he contributed to more than a hundred battles for his tribe. By the time of the rise of Islam, he was already an old man and remained a pagan.

Pedigree of Dorayd bin Al Soma 
Dorayd bin Al Soma (Muawiyah) bin Al-Harith bin Muawiyah bin Bakr bin Alqa bin Khuza'ah bin Ghazieh bin Jashem bin Saad bin Bakr bin Hawazen

His attributes 
Dorayd bin Al Summah is a brave knight and poet, and Muhammad bin Salam Al-Jumahi made him the first poet of the knights. He was the longest war poet, and Abu Ubaidah said: Dorayd bin Al Summah was the leader of Banu Jashem bin Saad, their knight and their leader, and participated in about a hundred battles, he did not lose in one of them, and he heard about Islam but did not embrace it, and participated in the Battle of Hunayn.

Brothers 
Duraid had four brothers: Abdullah, who was killed by Ghatafan, Abd Yaghoth, who was killed by Banu Murra, Qais, who was killed by Banu Abi Bakr Ibn Kilab, and Khalid, who was killed by Banu al-Harith Ibn Ka’b. Their mother is Rehana, the daughter of Ma’dikarb al-Zubaidi, the sister of Amr ibn Ma’dikarb

His story with Khansa 
In his old age, he proposed marriage to the poet Al-Khansa. According to the Kitab al-Aghani, she sent a slave woman to watch him urinate, saying "If his urine cuts into the ground, he has got something left in him; but if his urine trickles over the surface, there's no zip in him." The slave woman observed only a weak stream of urine, so Al-Khansa refused his offer of marriage.

See also 
 Battle of Hunayn

References

7th-century Arabic poets
Year of death unknown
Year of birth unknown
Hawazin
One Thousand and One Nights characters
6th-century Arabs
7th-century Arabs